Naganuma may refer to:

Places
Naganuma, Fukushima, a former town in Fukushima Prefecture, Japan
Naganuma, Hokkaidō, a town in Hokkaidō, Japan
Naganuma, Iwate, a former village in Iwate Prefecture, Japan
Naganuma, Nagano, a former village in Nagano Prefecture, Japan
Naganuma, Tochigi, a former village in Tochigi Prefecture, Japan
Naganuma, Yamagata, a former village in Yamagata Prefecture, Japan

People with the surname

Hidehisa Naganuma, Japanese mathematician, who introduced Doi–Naganuma lifting in mathematics
Hideki Naganuma, Japanese video game composer
 Hiroshi Naganuma, professional shogi player

Japanese-language surnames